Imantocera plumosa is a species of beetle in the family Cerambycidae. It was described by Olivier in 1792, originally under the genus Cerambyx. It is known from Java, Borneo, Malaysia, and Sumatra.

References

Lamiini
Beetles described in 1792